Sodium-coupled neutral amino acid transporter 1 is a protein that in humans is encoded by the SLC38A1 gene.

Amino acid transporters play essential roles in the uptake of nutrients, production of energy, chemical metabolism, detoxification, and neurotransmitter cycling. SLC38A1 is an important transporter of glutamine, an intermediate in the detoxification of ammonia and the production of urea. Glutamine serves as a precursor for the synaptic transmitter, glutamate (Gu et al., 2001).[supplied by OMIM]

References

Further reading

Solute carrier family